Poboishchnoye is a rural locality (a village) in Nyuksenskoye Rural Settlement, Nyuksensky District, Vologda Oblast, Russia. The population was 20 as of 2002.

Geography 
Poboishchnoye is located 33 km northeast of Nyuksenitsa (the district's administrative centre) by road. Gora is the nearest rural locality.

References 

Rural localities in Nyuksensky District